The following are lists of affiliates of the NBC television network:

List of NBC television affiliates (by U.S. state)
List of NBC television affiliates (table)
List of former NBC television affiliates

See also
Lists of ABC television affiliates
Lists of CBS television affiliates
Lists of Fox television affiliates